Borough 8 is a southeastern borough of Düsseldorf, the state capital of North Rhine-Westphalia, Germany. The borough covers an area of 20.96 square kilometres and (as of December 2020) has about 61,000 inhabitants. The borough borders with the Düsseldorf boroughs 2, 3, 7 and 9. To the East the borough borders with the rural district of Mettmann.

Subdivisions 
Borough 8 is made up of four Stadtteile (city parts):

See also 
 Boroughs of Düsseldorf

References

External links 
 Official webpage of the borough 

!